Ardleigh Green  is an area in east London, England, within the London Borough of Havering. This part of London is predominantly residential.

Amenities and natural geography

Ardleigh Green has a small set of shops and London Bus services to Hornchurch, Gidea Park and Romford. The area naturally drains to form the headwaters of a stream, The Ravensbourne which briefly flows, before joining the River Rom.

Toponymy
The place is an enlargement of a hamlet of (within the parish of) Hornchurch, known only as Hardley Green in various orthographies (written forms) until at least the early 17th century.  With various hamlets, Hornchurch, Havering(-atte-Bower) and Romford formed not a Hundred (division of a county for minor purposes) but a liberty, the Liberty of Havering. For many centuries the three old churches of these places remained of chapel and chapelry administrative status only, as the liberty matched the area of the ancient parish of Hornchurch, which provided a substantial living (benefice, of capital and income for the parish priest) in the church.

The first written name Haddeleye and all later forms evidence a clear corruption or natural progression of an older form, meaning "heath clearing" or perhaps more specifically "clearing [in the] heather" from the Old English hæth and lēah. It was last referred to as "Hardley Green" in 1883, so appearing in that year's Ordnance Survey map.

Education

Ardleigh Green has a combined junior and primary school, as well as Havering College of Further and Higher Education.

Transport
The nearest railway stations are:

References

Areas of London
Districts of the London Borough of Havering